Hilaire Kédigui (born 19 September 1982 ) is a retired Chadian football player. His last club was Chadian Foullah Edifice FC.

Career
Kédigui began his career with Tourbillon FC before signing in summer 2009 for AS Mangasport. From 2011 until 2014 he played for Gazelle FC. He finished his career in Foullah Edifice FC. He could play all the positions in midfield and attack, but usually played left midfield position or left central/defensive midfielder. He is left-footed.

International career
He played for the Chad national football team in 2010 World Cup qualifiers  and was part of the team that played African Nations Cup 2012 and 2017 qualifiers.

International goals

See also
 List of Chad international footballers

References

External links
 

1982 births
Living people
Chadian footballers
Chadian expatriate footballers
Expatriate footballers in Gabon
Chad international footballers
Chadian expatriate sportspeople in Gabon
People from N'Djamena
AS Mangasport players
US Bitam players
Association football midfielders